Trading Places is a 1983 comedy film directed by John Landis and starring Dan Aykroyd and Eddie Murphy.

Trading Places may also refer to:
 "Trading Places" (song), a song by American R&B singer Usher
 Trading Places International, an American vacation and timeshare company

TV Episodes

Children’s Television Shows
 Trading Places, an episode of the animated television series All Grown Up!
 Trading Places!, an episode of the children's television series Barney & Friends
 Trading Places, an episode of the 2012 TV series Littlest Pet Shop
 Trading Places, an episode of the TV series Odd Squad

Other
 Trading Places, an episode of the first season of  The Apprentice.
 Trading Places (Family Guy), an episode of the animated television series Family Guy
 Trading Places Zoey 101 Season 4

See also
 Trading Spaces